Screamin' Rachael, a Chicago native, was born Rachael Cain. Dubbed the “Queen of House Music” by Billboard magazine, Rachael has been connected to the evolution of the House music genre. She has worked with performers such as Grandmaster Melle Mel, Marshall Jefferson, Colonel Abrams, Afrika Bambaataa, and many others.

Career
Screamin Rachael's first release with Trax Records was "My Main Man," TX110. In 1987, she released, Fun With Bad Boys, which she released in 1985 with her friend and mentor, Afrika Bambaata. 

Rachael became owner and operator of Trax Records and its trademark in 2007.

In popular culture
Rachael was part of the 1980s–1990s Club Kids scene and, in the documentary about its founder, titled Glory Daze: The Life and Times of Michael Alig (2015), she discusses her reaction to the disappearance of her friend Andre "Angel" Melendez and a song she wrote about it, titled "Give Me My Freedom/Murder in Clubland".

Her background has resulted in her being the subject of and in her making an appearance in multiple books, films, and documentaries. These include:
The History of House Music
 Nightclubbing
The Last Party
Techno Style
Party Monster: The Shockumentary (1998), Michael Alig details his and Gitsie's cross country drive after Alig and his roommate, Robert D. "Freeze" Riggs, had murdered Angel Melendez. The trip included a visit to Alig's friend, Screamin Rachael, who promptly released a song based on Angel's disappearance and rumors about his murder, titled "Give Me My Freedom/Murder in Clubland".
Party Monster (2003)
Disco Bloodbath 
 Glory Daze: The Life and Times of Michael Alig (2015)
 As herself in the film Night Owl (1993)

References

External links
 Trax Records discography from discogs.com
 http://www.screaminrachael.com 
 Web site of the now-revived label
 Top 5: Trax Records Releases
 https://www.last.fm/music/Rachael+Cain/+wiki 
 https://www.rollingstone.com/music/music-features/favorite-dance-tracks-of-all-time-1385436/ 
 https://myemail.constantcontact.com/Just-Released--August-20---Screamin--Rachael--Queen-of-House---Trax-Records-.html?soid=1100885080641&aid=u350sgpC1Y4 
 http://www.dmcworld.net/uncategorized/screamin-rachael-cain%E2%80%A8%E2%80%A8%E2%80%A8/ 

American music people
Living people
American women chief executives
Year of birth missing (living people)
21st-century American women